The men's double sculls competition at the 2012 Summer Olympics in London took place are at Dorney Lake which, for the purposes of the Games venue, is officially termed Eton Dorney.

Schedule

All times are British Summer Time (UTC+1)

Results

Heats
First three of each heat qualify to the semifinals, remainder goes to the repeachge.

Heat 1

Heat 2

Heat 3

Repechage
First three qualify to the semifinals.

Semifinals
First three qualify to the final.

Semifinal 1

Semifinal 2

Finals

Final B

Final A
New Zealand rower Hamish Bond watched fellow team members Nathan Cohen and Joseph Sullivan in their final, and with 500 m to go, they were 3.5 sec down on the leaders and in fourth place; whilst they were the reigning world champions and had dominated the qualifying races, Bond was convinced that they had no chance of winning their final. But they had the most impressive sprint and won by half a length.

References

Men's double sculls
Men's events at the 2012 Summer Olympics